Scheherazade's Diary is a 2013 film directed by Zeina Daccache.

Synopsis
The women inmates of Lebanon's Baabda Prison relate their personal experiences and feelings about patriarchy as they prepare and present the first theatre performance staged inside an Arab women's prison. It was filmed during and after the ten-month 2012 drama therapy/theatre project in the prison. It features the women inmates.
 
In the film, the women reveal stories of domestic violence, traumatic childhood, failed marriage, unhappy romance and deprivation of motherhood. The film follows the women  as they rehearse for the show and intermingles scenes from the live performance with testimonials and backstage antics.

Awards and nominations
The FIPRESCI prize (International Critics Prize) Documentary category at the 10th Annual Dubai International Film Festival (Dec 6-14, 2013) Dubai, United Arab Emirates.
The special mention prize in the Muhr Arab Documentary category at the 10th Annual Dubai International Film Festival (Dec 6-14, 2013).
The GOLD FIFOG award for the best documentary at FIFOG film festival Geneva April 2014
The Human Rights Award at FIDADOC film festival Agadir, Morocco May 2014.
2014 URTI Grand Prix-Arman Trophy for Author's Documentary, June 2014, Monaco.
Best Documentary Prize at the 11th edition of the Lebanese Film Festival, June 2014
Al Araby TV Network Award, Malmo Arab Film Festival, September 2014
The Special Mention at the 36th edition of Cinemed, International Mediterranean Film Festival of Montpellier, November 2014
Best Arab Film Prize at the 36th edition of Cairo International film Festival on the 18th of Nov 2014
Best Lebanese Motion Picture Soundtrack at the Lebanese Cinema Movie Guide Awards 2014

References

External links
 

2013 films
Lebanese documentary films
Documentary films about the penal system